Toni Markus Vilander (born 25 July 1980) is a Finnish professional racing driver who currently drives for the Risi Competizione Ferrari team in various categories of sports car racing.

After a single-seater career which reached the level of the GP2 Series in 2005, Vilander switched to GT racing.

Career

Born in Kankaanpää, Vilander started racing karts at the age of five, winning the Junior A class of the Finnish Karting Championship in 1995, and both the German and Oceanic championships in 1999. He then upgraded to open-wheel cars in 2001. By 2004, he was competing in Italian Formula 3 with the Coloni team, and upgraded to Italian Formula 3000 in 2005, as well as competing in the Italian GT series.

However, trouble was brewing in the Coloni GP2 team, as lead driver Gianmaria Bruni had a row and left mid-season. Vilander got the call-up from Coloni to be Bruni's temporary substitute and competed in the Italian and Belgian rounds of the championship. He proved a competent midfield runner, finishing 15th, 8th, 14th and 13th in the four races in which he took part. For the season-closing double-header in Bahrain, Coloni chose to replace Vilander with Ferdinando Monfardini, and Toni went back to his normal drives. Vilander finished 25th overall in the series' inaugural year with no points, but was more successful in Italian Formula 3000, where he finished fourth with 23 points, and more successful still in Italian GT2, where he was crowned champion with his co-driver Alessandro Pier Guidi, scoring a total of 182 points.

In January 2006, Vilander, Pier Guidi and Giambattista Giannoccaro won the GT2 class of the Mil Milhas Brasil race and were placed fourth overall, driving a Ferrari 360. Using that same car, he went on to win that year's GT2 class of the Italian GT Championship. He also won the GT1 class of the 2006 Italian GT Championship with Giannoccaro, driving a Maserati MC12. For one race, he made a guest appearance in the FIA GT Championship.

Continuing his sportscar success, Vilander won the GT2 class of the 2007 FIA GT Championship with teammate Dirk Müller. In 2008 he teamed up with Gianmaria Bruni and retained his title. He also competed in the American Le Mans Series alongside Jaime Melo in a Ferrari 458 Italia GTC for Risi Competizione.

Vilander has competed in six Le Mans 24 Hours races from 2008 onwards, driving Ferraris for the AF Corse team. In 2008, he shared a Ferrari 430 with Thomas Biagi and Christian Montanari in the GT2 class but failed to finish. Two years later, he returned to La Sarthe to drive a Ferrari 458 Italia with Jean Alesi and Giancarlo Fisichella, finishing 16th overall and fourth in the GT2 class. In 2011 he again drove a 458 with Fisichella and Gianmaria Bruni in the new GTE-Pro category, improving to 13th overall and second in class having held the class lead for much of the 24 hours. For the 2012 race, the trio returned and won the class convincingly (finishing 17th overall) despite the car having to be completely rebuilt for the race following Fisichella's crash in practice, missing qualifying and starting from the back of the grid as a result. In , he again drove a 458 for AF Corse, this time with Kamui Kobayashi and Olivier Beretta, finishing fifth in the GTE-Pro class. He was reunited with Bruni and Fisichella once more for the  race, and the trio took another class victory.

Vilander made his début in the FIA GT1 World Championship in 2012, again driving a Ferrari 458 Italia for AF Corse alongside Filip Salaquarda. The duo took two victories—one at the Slovakiaring and the other at the Nürburgring—and Vilander finished ninth in the drivers' standings after missing the final round of the season. He did not return to the series in 2013 due to his increased World Endurance Championship commitments for the team.

Vilander has competed in the FIA World Endurance Championship since the series was launched in 2012, having made sporadic appearances in the interim Intercontinental Le Mans Cup series which preceded it. In 2012 he shared a Ferrari 458 Italia with Bruni and Fisichella in AF Corse's lead entry for three of the championship's eight rounds, winning at Le Mans and in Bahrain, assisting the team to win the LMGTE Pro Trophy. For the 2013 season, he was switched to the team's second entry full-time, with Kamui Kobayashi and Olivier Beretta. For the final race in Bahrain, he was swapped with Fisichella in the lead entry due to the latter's disappointing performances, and duly won the class with Bruni to narrowly retain AF Corse's class championship over the works Aston Martin Racing team. With Kobayashi returning to Formula One, Vilander remains with the lead AF Corse team in 2014 with Bruni, and has won the races at Spa-Francorchamps and Le Mans (the latter also with Fisichella) to lead the GTE manufacturers' championship and the newly introduced GTE drivers' championship after three races.

In 2016 Vilander will team up with Giancarlo Fisichella in WeatherTech SportsCar Championship.

On 5 February 2017, Vilander won the 2017 Liqui Moly Bathurst 12 Hour at the Mount Panorama Circuit in Bathurst, Australia for Australian team Maranello Motorsport driving with multiple Bathurst 1000 winners Craig Lowndes and Jamie Whincup in a Ferrari 488 GT3 to become the second Finnish driver to win the Bathurst 12 Hour after Mika Salo had won the event in 2014. Despite it being his first drive at Bathurst, Vilander impressed when claimed the Allan Simonsen Trophy for pole position and in a brilliant drive also set the fastest lap of the race.

Racing record

Complete Formula 3 Euro Series results
(key) (Races in bold indicate pole position) (Races in italics indicate fastest lap)

Complete GP2 Series results
(key) (Races in bold indicate pole position) (Races in italics indicate fastest lap)

24 Hours of Le Mans results

Complete FIA GT Championship results

Complete GT1 World Championship results

Complete FIA World Endurance Championship results
(key) (Races in bold indicate pole position; races in
italics indicate fastest lap)

Complete Bathurst 12 Hour results

Complete IMSA SportsCar Championship results
(key) (Races in bold indicate pole position; results in italics indicate fastest lap)

References

External links
 
 

1980 births
Living people
People from Kankaanpää
Finnish racing drivers
Italian Formula Renault 2.0 drivers
Formula Renault Eurocup drivers
GP2 Series drivers
Auto GP drivers
Italian Formula Three Championship drivers
24 Hours of Le Mans drivers
FIA GT Championship drivers
American Le Mans Series drivers
European Le Mans Series drivers
24 Hours of Daytona drivers
Rolex Sports Car Series drivers
FIA GT1 World Championship drivers
FIA World Endurance Championship drivers
Blancpain Endurance Series drivers
WeatherTech SportsCar Championship drivers
24 Hours of Spa drivers
Asian Le Mans Series drivers
GT World Challenge America drivers
Sportspeople from Satakunta
Scuderia Coloni drivers
AF Corse drivers
Karting World Championship drivers
Extreme Speed Motorsports drivers
SMP Racing drivers
Piquet GP drivers
Team Astromega drivers
RP Motorsport drivers
Ferrari Competizioni GT drivers